The 35th Infantry Regiment ("Cacti") was created on 1 July 1916 at Douglas, Arizona from elements of the 11th, 18th and 22nd Infantry Regiments. The 35th served on the Mexico–US border during the First World War and was stationed at Nogales, Arizona in 1918. It fought a border skirmish on 27 August 1918 during the Battle of Ambos Nogales.

In World War II, Korea, and Vietnam it served as part of the 25th Infantry (Tropic Lightning) Division.

As of 2012, the only active element of the regiment is the 2d Battalion, which is assigned to the 3d Brigade Combat Team (Infantry), 25th Infantry Division.

Heraldry
The regiment's coat of arms and its distinctive unit insignia reflect its history. The regiment was originally formed in Arizona from elements of the 11th, 18th, and 22d Infantry Regiments. These organizations are represented on the canton of the crest, in the upper left-hand corner. The white Maltese cross represents the 11th Regiment, the red acorn represents the 18th Regiment, and the embattled partition line of the canton represents the 22nd Regiment. The cactus represents the original service along the Mexico–US border against the revolutionaries of General Francisco Villa.

Distinctive unit insignia
The following is a direct quote from the US Army The Institute of Heraldry regarding the 35th Regiment.

Description/blazon
A gold color metal and enamel device 1 1/16 inches (2.70 cm) in height overall consisting of a shield blazoned: Argent, a giant cactus Vert. On a canton embattled (for the 22d Infantry) Azure, a cross patée of the field (for the 11th Infantry) charged with an acorn Gules (for the 18th Infantry).

Symbolism
This regiment was originally organized in Arizona with personnel from the 11th, 18th and 22d Infantry. These organizations are shown on the canton. During the Civil War the predecessor of the 11th Infantry was in the 2d Division, V Corps, the badge of which was a white Maltese cross; the 18th Infantry was in the 1st Division, XIV Corps, with a red acorn as the badge. The 22d Infantry is represented by the embattled partition line of the canton. The cactus represents the original service of the 35th Infantry on the Mexico–US border.

Background 
The distinctive unit insignia was originally approved on 28 Jun 1923. It was amended to change the method of wear on 30 Apr 1926.

Coat of arms
The following is a direct quote from the US Army The Institute of Heraldry regarding the 35th Regiment.

Description/Blazon 
Shield
Argent, a giant cactus Vert. On a canton embattled (for the 22d Infantry) Azure, a cross patée of the field (for the 11th Infantry) charged with an acorn Gules (for the 18th Infantry). 
Crest
On a wreath of the colors (Argent and Vert) a walnut tree Proper. 
Motto
TAKE ARMS.

Symbolism 
Shield
This regiment was organized at Douglas, Arizona, in July 1916 from the 11th, 18th and 22d regiments of Infantry. These organizations are shown on a canton. In the Civil War the predecessor of the 11th Infantry was in the 2d Division, V Corps, the badge of which was a white Maltese cross; the 18th Infantry was in the 1st Division, 14th Army Corps, with a red acorn as the badge. The 22d Infantry was originally the 2d Battalion, 13th Infantry and as such distinguished itself at the Siege of Vicksburg, receiving the name "First at Vicksburg." This is shown by the embattled partition line of the canton. The cactus represents the original border service of the 35th Infantry.

Crest
The crest commemorates the baptism of fire of the regiment at Nogales, the Spanish for walnut trees.

Background
The coat of arms was approved on 9 Apr 1920.

Motto
The regimental motto is "Take Arms!" During the Battle of Ambos Nogales in 1918 when the alarm went out, officers, non-commissioned officers and soldiers shouted out, "Take Arms! Take Arms!"

World War I

The 35th Infantry Regiment was stationed at Nogales, Arizona on 27 August 1918, when at about 4:10 pm, a gun battle erupted unintentionally when a Mexican civilian attempted to pass through the border, back to Mexico, without being interrogated at the U.S. Customs house. After the initial shooting, reinforcements from both sides rushed to the border line. Hostilities quickly escalated and several soldiers were killed and others wounded.

The U.S. 35th Infantry border post had about 15–18 men and requested reinforcements from their garrison. When they arrived they requested the Buffalo Soldiers of the 10th Cavalry. The 10th, commanded by Frederick Herman, came to their aid from their camp outside of town. After observing the situation for a few moments, Lt Colonel Herman ordered an attack on the Mexican and German held hilltops overlooking the border town. Defensive trenches and machine gun placements had been seen being dug there in the previous weeks. Herman wanted Americans there before Mexican reinforcements got there.

Under heavy fire, the U.S. 35th Regiment infantry soldiers and dismounted 10th Cavalry troops advanced across the Mexico–US border through the buildings and streets of Nogales, Sonora and up onto the nearby hilltops. This was done while other units of the 35th Regiment held the main line near the border post. About 7:45 pm, the Mexicans waved a large white flag of surrender over their customs building. Lt. Colonel Herman observed and then ordered an immediate cease fire. Snipers on both sides continued shooting for a little while after the cease fire, but were eventually silenced upon orders from their superiors.

World War II

The 35th Regiment was attached to the 25th Infantry Division in Hawaii. It was sent to Guadalcanal, 25 November 1942, to relieve Marines near Henderson Field. First elements landed near the Tenaru River, 17 December 1942, and entered combat, 10 January 1943, participating in the seizure of Kokumbona and the reduction of the Mount Austen Pocket in some of the bitterest fighting of the Pacific campaign. With other units on 5 February 1943 it helped end organized enemy resistance.

A period of garrison duty followed, ending 21 July: On that date, advance elements debarked on Munda, New Georgia. The 35th Infantry, under the Northern Landing Force, took part in the capture of Vella Lavella, 15 August to 15 September 1943. Organized resistance on New Georgia ended, 25 August, and the division moved to New Zealand for rest and training, last elements arriving on 5 December. The 25th was transferred to New Caledonia, 3 February – 14 March 1944, for continued training.

The division landed in the San Fabian area of Luzon, 11 January 1945, to enter the struggle for the liberation of the Philippines. It drove across the Luzon Central Plain, meeting the enemy at Binalonan, 17 January. Moving through the rice paddies, the 25th occupied Umingan, Lupao, and San Jose and destroyed a great part of the Japanese armor on Luzon. On 21 February, the division began operations in the Caraballo Mountains. It fought its way along Highway No. 5, taking Digdig, Putlan, and Kapintalan against fierce enemy counterattacks and took Balete Pass, 13 May, and opened the gateway to the Cagayan Valley, 27 May, with the capture of Santa Fe. Until 30 June, when the division was relieved, it carried out mopping-up activities. On 1 July, the division moved to Tarlac for training, leaving for Japan, 20 September. At the end of the war the 35th was involved with occupation duty in Japan.

The regiment had three Medal of Honor recipients during World War II, William G. Fournier, Lewis R. Hall and Charles L. McGaha.

Korean War

Open warfare once again flared in Asia, now the 25th division's primary area of concern, on 25 June 1950. The North Korean People's Army crossed the 38th Parallel on that day in an attack on the Republic of Korea (South Korea). Acting under United Nations orders, the Tropic Lightning Division moved from its base in Japan to Korea between 5–18 July 1950. The 35th fought out of the Pusan perimeter and was part of the successful drive into North Korea in October 1950. In a sudden and unexpected reversal, however, an overwhelming number of Chinese Communist troops crossed the Yalu and pushed back United Nations forces all along the front. The 35th Regiment was forced to carry out a systematic withdrawal and ordered to take up defensive positions on the south bank of the Chongchon River 30 November 1950. Eventually, these lines failed. However, after a series of short withdrawals a permanent battle line was established south of Osan. Then followed the see-saw battles that finally evolved into static warfare along the Iron Triangle into 1952.

The 35th Regiment with the rest of the 25th Infantry Division assumed the responsibility of guarding the approaches of Seoul 5 May 1953. 23 days later, when ceasefire negotiations at Panmunjom stalled, a heavy PVA assault hit the Nevada Complex, the Division held its ground; the brunt of the attack was absorbed by the attached Turkish Brigade and the 14th Infantry Regiment. By successfully defending Seoul from continued attack from May to July 1953, the division earned its second Republic of Korea Presidential Unit Citation. Again negotiators moved toward peace. In July, the division again moved to reserve status at Camp Casey where it remained through the signing of the armistice 27 July 1953. Fourteen division soldiers were awarded Medals of Honor during the Korean War, making the division one of the most decorated US Army divisions of that war.

The regiment remained in Korea until 1954 and returned to Hawaii from September through October of that year. After a 12-year absence, the 25th Infantry Division had finally returned home.

The 35th Infantry Regiment had three Medal of Honor recipients in Korea, William R. Jecelin, Billie G. Kanell and Donald R. Moyer.

Vietnam

In August 1965, elements of the 35th Infantry started their rotation into the Vietnam War, arriving in South Vietnam. The 1st and 2d battalions, along with the 1st Battalion, 14th Infantry, and the 2d Battalion, 9th Artillery provided the core combat units of the 3d Brigade, 25th Infantry Division and were deployed to the Central Highlands at Pleiku. Final units arrived by Christmas 1965. The battalions of the 35th Infantry were heavily engaged from January 1966 until 1972 throughout the I Corps and II Corps areas of operations (the Central Highlands and central coastal areas of Vietnam). In August 1967, operational control of the two battalions of the 35th Infantry and all of the other parts of the 3d Brigade were transferred from the 25th Infantry Division to the 4th Infantry Division (which had deployed to the Central Highlands in late 1966).

From May through June 1970, the battalions of the 35th Infantry participated in the Incursion operations against enemy sanctuaries located in Cambodia, seizing thousands of tons of supplies and hundreds of weapons. Following its return from Cambodia to South Vietnam, the division resumed its place in the Vietnamization Program. The war was winding down. By late December 1970, elements of the 35th Infantry were able to begin redeployment to Schofield Barracks.

The 35th Infantry had three Medal of Honor recipients in Vietnam, Stephen Karopczyc, Ronald Eric Ray and Kenneth E. Stumpf.

Reorganization and 'light infantry' status
After its return to Schofield Barracks, the battalions of the 35th Infantry became a cadre unit due to the overall military downsizing and was part of a single brigade numbering 4,000 men. The 35th Infantry trained for the next eight years throughout the Pacific Theater and continued to improve its combat capabilities with troop deployment varying in size from squads, who participated in training missions with Fijian forces, to exercises as large as Team Spirit, where more than 5,000 divisional troops and 1700 pieces of equipment were airlifted to South Korea for this annual exercise.

In 1985, the 35th Infantry with the rest of the 25th Division began its reorganization from a conventional infantry division to a light infantry division. The four primary characteristics of this new light infantry division were to be: mission flexibility, rapid deployment and combat readiness at 100 percent strength with a Pacific Basin orientation. The 25th Infantry Division earned the designation "light" — the reorganization was completed by 1 October 1986.

In 1988, the 35th Infantry participated in rotations at the Joint Readiness Training Center, Fort Chaffee, Arkansas. This training center provides the most realistic training available to light forces in the Army. Coupled with Joint/Combined training exercises Cobra Gold in Thailand, Kangaroo in Australia and Orient Shield in Japan, the 25th Division's demanding exercise schedule significantly increased the division's fighting capabilities. Until 1993 Operation Team Spirit in Korea remained the division's largest annual maneuver exercise, involving more than half of the division's strength.

Desert Storm and post-Cold War
The 35th Infantry units did not participate in Operation Desert Storm, due to the 25th Division being earmarked for Pacific contingencies, such as a renewal of hostilities in Korea.

In 1995, the 25th Division underwent another reorganization and reduction as a part of the Army's downsizing, but most elements of the 35th Infantry were maintained.

In early 2005, an airborne brigade was created at Fort Richardson, Alaska and added to the 25th. Today the "Tropic Lightning" Division is composed of the 1st and 2d Brigade Combat Teams (based in Fort Wainwright, Alaska and Schofield Barracks, Hawaii, respectively), the 3d Brigade Combat Team (Schofield Barracks) and The 4th Brigade Combat Team (based at Fort Richardson, Alaska), in addition to the Combat Aviation Brigade. As a major ground reserve force for the U.S. Pacific Command, the "Tropic Lightning" Division routinely deploys from Schofield Barracks to participate in exercises in Japan, Korea, Thailand, the Philippines, Australia and the Big Island of Hawaii.

Transformation and War on Terror

The 35th Infantry and the 3d Brigade did not take part in the fighting in Afghanistan and Iraq from 2001 to 2003. The 3d Brigade, 25th Infantry Division began deploying in the divisional second stage to Afghanistan in March 2004. The 25th Infantry Division redeployed to Schofield Barracks Hawaii in April 2005. One of the missions of the 3d Brigade was to track down insurgent Taliban and Al-Qaeda members in the mountainous terrain of Afghanistan.

In 2005, the division's elements of the 35th Infantry, as part of the 3d Brigade, took part in the brigade's transformation into a Brigade Combat Team (BCT). The (Light) status was dropped from the 25th Division designation in January 2006. Also, the term "regiment," dropped at the onset of the Pentomic (battle group) era in the late 1950s, began to be used again for units such as the 35th.

In March 2009, the 35th Infantry, as part of the 3d BCT, deployed to Iraq in support of Operation Iraqi Freedom.

In June–August 2009, the 25th Division was deployed in Operation Champion Sword.

From March 2011–March 2012, the 35th Infantry Regiment was deployed to RC East, Afghanistan in support of Operation Enduring Freedom.

Honors
The regiment has received the following unit awards:

Additional decorations of 1st Battalion

Company A additionally entitled to

Company B additionally entitled to

History
The 35th Infantry regimental history dates from 1916.

 Constituted 1 July 1916 in the Regular Army as Company B, 35th Infantry
 Organized 13 July 1916 at Douglas, Arizona – Constituted 1 July 1916 in the Regular Army as Company B, 35th Infantry
 Organized 13 July 1916 at Douglas, Arizona
(35th Infantry assigned 7 August 1918 to the 18th Division; relieved 14 February 1919 from assignment to the 18th Division; assigned 17 October 1922 to the Hawaiian Division; relieved 1 October 1941 from assignment to the Hawaiian Division and assigned to the 25th Infantry Division)
 Inactivated 1 February 1957 at Schofield Barracks, Hawaii, and relieved from assignment to the 25th Infantry Division; concurrently redesignated as Headquarters and Headquarters Company, 2d Battle Group, 35th Infantry
 Assigned 19 February 1962 to the 25th Infantry Division and activated at Schofield Barracks, Hawaii (organic elements concurrently constituted and activated)
 Reorganized and redesignated 12 August 1963 as the 2d Battalion, 35th Infantry
 Relieved 1 August 1967 from assignment to the 25th Infantry Division and assigned to the 4th Infantry Division
 Relieved 15 December 1970 from assignment to the 4th Infantry Division and assigned to the 25th Infantry Division
 Inactivated 5 June 1972 at Schofield Barracks, Hawaii, and relieved from assignment to the 25th Infantry Division
 Assigned 16 August 1995 to the 25th Infantry Division and activated at Schofield Barracks, Hawaii

Campaign history
Campaign participation credits;

World War II

 Central Pacific
 Guadalcanal
 Northern Solomons (with arrowhead)
 Luzon

Korean War

 UN Defensive
 UN Offensive
 CCF Intervention
 First UN Counteroffensive
 CCF Spring Offensive
 UN Summer-Fall Offensive
 Second Korean Winter
 Korea, Summer-Fall 1952
 Third Korean Winter
 Korea, Summer 1953

Vietnam

 Counteroffensive
 Counteroffensive, Phase II
 Counteroffensive, Phase III
 Tet Counteroffensive
 Counteroffensive, Phase IV
 Counteroffensive, Phase V
 Counteroffensive, Phase VI
 Tet 69/Counteroffensive
 Summer-Fall 1969
 Winter-Spring 1970
 Sanctuary Counteroffensive
 Counteroffensive, Phase VII

References

External links

 35th Infantry Regiment Association website
 25th Infantry Division Home Page  – official site.
  GlobalSecurity.org: 2nd Battalion-35th Infantry
 GlobalSecurity.org: 25th Infantry Division (Light)
 25th Infantry Division Association

0035
Infantry regiments of the United States Army in World War II
USInfReg0035
Military units and formations of the United States Army in the Vietnam War
Military units and formations in Hawaii
Military units and formations established in 1916